The Australian Council of Social Service (ACOSS) is an Australian organisation that advocates for action to reduce poverty and inequality, and is the peak body for the community services sector in Australia. It was formed in 1956.

ACOSS is active in areas of social policy, including community sector policy, climate and energy, economics and tax, income support and employment, health, housing and homelessness, and poverty and inequality.

Cassandra Goldie became CEO of ACOSS in July 10, who was previously the Director of the Sex Discrimination Unit at the Australian Human Rights Commission (HREOC).

The ACOSS CEO is often interviewed by Australian media for comment and analysis on social matters and policies of the Australian Government.

Governance
ACOSS has a 9-person volunteer Board of Governors, elected according to the constitution  adopted in August 2019.

Presidents
 June 2020 - present: Peter McNamara
 January 2016 - June 2020: Tony Reidy
 January 2015 - December 2016: Micaela Cronin
 December 2013 - January 2015: Francis Lynch
 November 2009 – November 2013: Simon Schrapel
 May–November 2009: David Thompson (interim)
 2005-May 2009: Lin Hatfield Dodds
 2001-2005: Andrew McCallum
 1997-2000: Michael Raper
 1993-1997: Robert Fitzgerald 
 1989-1993: Merle Mitchell 
 1985-1989: Julian Disney

Members
Source:

State and Territory Councils of Social Service
 ACT Council of Social Service (ACTCOSS)
 NSW Council of Social Service (NCOSS)
 South Australian Council of Social Service (SACOSS)
 Northern Territory Council of Social Service (NTCOSS)
 Queensland Council of Social Service (QCOSS)
 Tasmanian Council of Social Service (TasCOSS)
 Victorian Council of Social Service (VCOSS)
 Western Australia Council of Social Service (WACOSS)

National constituency organization members
 Anti-Poverty Network SA
 Australian Unemployed Workers' Union
 Children and Young People with Disability Australia
 National Council of Single Mothers and their Children
 Women With Disabilities Australia
 YOUNG Campaigns
 People with Disability Australia 
 Women With Disabilities Australia

National organization members
 Adult Learning Australia
 Anglicare Australia
 Anti-poverty Week 
 Asylum Seeker Resource Centre 
 Australian Alcohol and other Drugs Council
 Australian Association of Social Workers
 Australian Baha’i Community
 Australian Communications Consumer Action Network 
 Australian Community Workers Association 
 Australian Council of State School Organisations 
 Australian Federation of AIDS Organisations
 Australian Federation of Disability Organisations 
 Australian Health Promotion Association 
 Australian Insulation Foundation 
 Australian Men’s Health Forum
 Australian Pensioners & Superannuants Federation
 Australian Red Cross
 Australian Youth Affairs Coalition
 Baptist Care Australia
 Better Renting 
 Brotherhood of St Laurence
 Carers Australia
 Catholic Social Services Australia
 Centre for Social Impact
 CHOICE
 Christians Against Poverty
 cohealth
 Community Colleges Australia
 Community Housing Industry Association
 Community Legal Centres Australia
 Community Mental Health Australia
 Community Transport Organisation
 Consumer Action Law Centre
 Consumers Health Forum of Australia
 COTA Australia
 DCSS Australia
 Disability Advocacy Network Australia
 Down Syndrome Australia
 Economic Justice Australia
 Edmund Rice Centre
 Family Relationship Services Australia
 Federation of Ethnic Communities’ Councils of Australia
 Financial Counselling Australia
 Foodbank Australia
 Foundation for Young Australians
 Good Shepherd Australia New Zealand
 Good Things Foundation Australia
 Goodstart Early Learning
 Health Justice Australia
 Homelessness Australia
 Homes for Homes
 HOST International
 Indian (Sub-Cont) Crisis & Support Agency 
 InfoXchange
 Jobs Australia
 Justice Connect
 LGBTIQ+ Health Australia
 Life Without Barriers
 Lojic Institute
 MacKillop Family Services
 Mind Australia
 Mission Australia
 MS Australia
 National Aboriginal and Torres Strait Islander Legal Service
 National Aboriginal Community Controlled Health Organisation
 National Association of People with HIV Australia
 National Association of Tenant Organisations
 National Ethnic Disability Alliance
 National Family Violence Prevention Legal Services Forum
 National Shelter
 Office for Social Justice, Australian Catholic Bishops Conference
 Oxfam Australia
 Playgroup Australia
 Public Health Association of Australia
 Rape & Domestic Violence Services Australia
 Reconciliation Australia
 Relationships Australia
 Save the Children
 Secretariat of National Aboriginal & Islander Child Care
 Settlement Council of Australia
 Settlement Services International
 Social Ventures Australia
 Society of St Vincent de Paul National Council
 Syndromes Without a Name (SWAN) Australia
 The Benevolent Society
 The Salvation Army Australia
 The Smith Family
 UnitingCare Australia
 Volunteering Australia
 WESNET
 YMCA Australia
 YWCA Australia

Associate Members
 Accordwest
 ADRA Australia Limited
 Anglicare Community Services
 Anglicare Victoria
 Association of Children’s Welfare Agencies Ltd. (ACWA)
 Australian Education Union (AEU)
 Australian Refugee and Migrant Care Services Ltd
 Australian Services Union (ASU)
 AWARE Community
 Berry Street
 BeyondHousing
 Blue Sky Community Services
 Caboolture Community Care Inc
 Cairns Alliance of Social Services
 Canberra Community Law
 Catholic Social Services Victoria
 CentaCare New England North West
 Centre for Excellence in Child and Family Welfare
 Centre for Women’s Economic Safety
 Churches Housing Incorporated
 Community Housing Industry Association NSW
 Community Industry Group
 Community Information and Support Victoria
 Community Resources Limited
 Container of Dreams
 CORE Community Services
 Cowra Information & Neighbourhood Centre
 Energetic Communities
 Family Support Newcastle
 Family Violence Legal Service Aboriginal Corporation
 Financial Counsellors’ Association of WA
 Financial Rights Legal Centre
 Glebe Youth Service
 Homelessness NSW
 Illawarra Legal Centre
 Institute of Child Protection Studies
 Jannawi Family Centre
 Lifetime Renewable Energy Pty Ltd
 Lutheran Community Care
 Melbourne’s Leading Nanny Agency
 Mountains Community Resource Network (MCRN)
 Muru Mittigar Limited
 Nepean Community and Neighbourhood Services (NCNS)
 One Future
 Orphans and Widows West Africa Inc.
 PeakCare Queensland Inc
 Peninsula Community Legal Centre Inc.
 Penrith City Council
 Queensland Youth Housing Coalition
 Rainbow Families Inc
 Samaritans Foundation
 Sector Connect
 Single Mothers Lobby Alliance
 Social Futures (Northern Rivers Social Development Council)
 South East Community Links
 South Port Community Housing Group Inc
 Southern Youth and Family Services
 St John’s Youth Services
 Sydney Community Forum
 Tangentyere Council Inc.
 Tenants Queensland
 Think+DO Tank Foundation
 United Workers Union
 Uniting Communities
 Uniting Country SA
 Welfare Rights Centre
 Westgate Community Initiatives Group
 WESTIR Ltd

References

External links 
 

Non-profit organisations based in New South Wales